The Tell Me You Love Me World Tour was the sixth headlining concert tour and third worldwide tour by American singer Demi Lovato, in support of her sixth studio album Tell Me You Love Me (2017). The tour began on February 26, 2018, in San Diego, California and concluded on July 22, 2018, in Paso Robles, California. It was supported by DJ Khaled, Kehlani and Iggy Azalea in North America and Jax Jones and Joy in Europe. The tour was initially supposed to conclude in November 2018 in Fortaleza, Brazil, but the remainder of the tour was cancelled after Lovato was hospitalized for a drug overdose on July 24, 2018 and entered rehab and treatment thereafter. Comprising 43 dates, the tour grossed $24.1 million and had a total attendance of 481,795.

Development
On October 26, 2017, Lovato first announced she was going to tour in 2018 with a special guest. Later that day, she revealed the special guest was DJ Khaled. During the American Music Awards 2017 backstage, Lovato announced that American R&B singer Kehlani would be joining Lovato and Khaled on the tour as the opening act. In an interview with Billboard, Lovato revealed the reason she chose the opening acts was that Kehlani inspired Tell Me You Love Me and DJ Khaled was "much fun to watch". Lovato announced on Good Morning America that their co-owned mental health program CAST Centers would return to join them on tour to provide free therapy sessions and wellness workshops after joining their co-headlining Future Now Tour in 2016. The session also featured guest speakers, including Lovato themself, DJ Khaled in Las Vegas date, Iggy Azalea during the Brooklyn stop, Kelsea Ballerini in Nashville and Lauren Jauregui in Miami.

On February 12, 2018, Lovato revealed the European tour dates, which were scheduled to start in May 2018. This marks Lovato's first European concert since a festival appearance during the French NRJ Music Tour in 2015. Three days later, on February 15, 2018, Latin American dates were announced in Brazil, Argentina, Chile, Ecuador, Costa Rica and Mexico. The Panama City date was announced on March 7. They were expected to take place in April and early May, but due to production issues, Lovato announced on April 10 that eight dates of the leg in Latin America were rescheduled, while the planned shows in Panama, Ecuador and Costa Rica were cancelled. Additional dates in Amsterdam, Belfast, Dublin and Newcastle were announced on March 13. Lovato added two festival appearances in England and Wales on April 4 and 5, 2018. On April 6, 2018, Lovato announced a show in Paso Robles, in which Australian rapper Iggy Azalea would join them as the opening act. On May 8, Lovato announced that English record producer Jax Jones would join them in United Kingdom dates as the supporting act. On May 21, it was announced that Lovato would take the stage in Atlantic City, with Lauv as an opening act. On May 23, Lovato announced that Australian singer and record producer Joy would support the European leg. On June 5, 2018, Becky G was announced as the opening act in Argentina and Brazil dates. About being the supporting act, Becky G told Billboard that it would be "awesome" to join Lovato on tour. She later explained that it was their second time being Lovato's supporting act since 2014 Demi World Tour and commented that she learned much from Lovato at that time. Mexican singer Jorge Blanco was announced as the opening act for the Mexican dates. On July 24, after an hospitalization, it was announced that Lovato would not perform at the show at Atlantic City, which was scheduled to take place on July 26. After speculation, on August 8, it was announced that the shows in Chile, Argentina and Brazil were cancelled due to health issues. The next day, it was announced that the shows in Mexico were also canceled due to the same reason.

Lovato told Billboard that the tour would have "a lot more production". "It will represent who I am as a person and an artist and I can't wait for this country to see it," she added. Lovato also aimed to take an intimate experience on the tour. "I'm going to utilize the arenas and really make sure that from every seat, you get to see my performance up close and personal, as much as we possibly can," she said. Rehearsals for the tour took place at Sleep Train Arena in Sacramento, California.

Concert synopsis

On the North American leg of the tour, the show is divided into five parts and an encore. The show begins with a montage of the tour's video interludes. Lovato rises from a hole in the floor, performing "You Don't Do It for Me Anymore" in a getup of a black dress and a trench coat. An interlude is played, which features Lovato portraying both mental health professional and patient. Lovato then appears on stage laying on a psychiatrist couch in a black leather bodysuit and thigh-high pointed boots, performing "Daddy Issues". Lovato performs "Cool for the Summer", accompanied by the eleven dancers performing same-sex erotic moves. The female dancers do synchronized chair-dancing while Lovato performs "Sexy Dirty Love", followed by "Heart Attack" with the male dancers breakdance. "Give Your Heart a Break" is then sung, with Lovato performs backed by a kiss cam.

The next segment of the show is introduced with a video interlude showing Lovato training mixed martial arts under UFC fighter Randy Couture. Lovato and her dancers walk through the crowd to the stage in a pink boxer robe, then performs "Confident". Lovato uses "everywhere at once" trick during the "Games" performance. The female dancers dress exactly like Lovato in black robe, then are arrayed across the venue. Lovato vanishes during the performance and immediately appears in a white lingerie on the B-stage, located in the back of the venue. The B-stage is set of white rotating bed. Lovato performs "Concentrate" while sitting down on the bed and playing an electric guitar. Lovato is joined by a pair of dancers to perform "Cry Baby". Lovato performs "Lonely" next, while two male dancers approaching them 

The dancers do a routine, while Lovato changes into a royal blue oversized hoodie and blue satin ankle boots. Lovato returns to the main stage to perform "No Promises". Lovato then performs "Échame la Culpa" with Luis Fonsi in video screen. Lovato reappears in a white bodysuit at a black piano. A video interlude showing Lovato's philanthropist work with CAST Center is shown. She also usually talks about her struggles with addictions and mental health before performing "Warrior". Lovato then performs "Father" and once the performance ends, a picture of Lovato and her late father, Patrick Lovato shows in video screen. Lovato then performs "Smoke & Mirrors" also at the piano. Lovato returns to the stage, accompanied by guest choir to perform "Sorry Not Sorry". Before the performance, a compilation of hate tweets towards Lovato is shown in video screen. Lovato also brings out gay men's chorus in a number of dates during the North American leg. Lovato closed off the show with "Tell Me You Love Me" while confetti rains down and Lovato disappears through the hole on the stage.

Critical reception

North America
Jim Harrington from Mercury News reviewed the show at SAP Center, saying Lovato was "in good form" throughout the show and called the "Warrior" performance as a highlight. Jason Bracelin of Las Vegas Review-Journal called the show as a "night of full-throated pop pathos" and praised Lovato for sharing her emotional struggles during the concert. Similar thoughts were echoed by Ashley Naftule of Phoenix New Times who observed the inspirational speech during the "Warrior" performance. "Not only could [Lovato] do pull off half a dozen costume changes, dance, sing her ass off, play the piano, and run around the arena like she was on a treasure hunt, Lovato could also deliver inspirational talks that were meaningful and moving," she wrote. Gatini Tinsley of News-Herald wrote that Lovato "proved to be all fans need" and called the "Father" performance as the "emotional high point of the show". Toronto Star'''s Nick Krewen rated the concert 3 stars out of 4, observing that "Lovato mesmerized the audience by every word and action". Reviewing the show at Wells Fargo Center, Matt Smith of NJ.com praised Lovato's vocal performance and compared them to Ariana Grande as "the 2010s-era pop generation's most versatile and powerful vocalists." Celia Almeida of Miami New Times highlighted the "Father" performance and compared the B-stage set to Madonna's Blond Ambition World Tour (1990).

In less favorable reviews, Taylor Frantum of Dallas Observer stated that the performances were "well executed" and went off without any hitch, but criticized the visual backdrops calling them "hollow" and "uninspired". Jon Bream of Star Tribune criticized Lovato's stage presence, saying "she did not have a strong physical presence, she did not fill the room." Writers of Creative Loafing noted that Lovato "could put on a great show vocally" but noticed her lack of energy during the Tampa show.

Europe
Ed Power of Metro Newspaper rated the show in Dublin four out of five stars, and called Lovato "brought a lump to the throat and a tear to the eye".  Caroline Sullivan from The Guardian gave the show in London four out of five stars. Calling the show "vulnerable but resolute", she writes: "...it would be a flinty onlooker who wasn't at least a little swayed by her commitment to telling 'my truth'." Vicky Townsend of East Anglian Daily Times described the show in Newmarket as "spine-tinglingly" and "breath-takingly brilliant", praised Lovato's vocal performance. Bert Hertogs of Concert News Belgium reviewed the show in Antwerp and rated the show three and a half stars. Hertogs praised Lovato's vocal performance but criticized the sexual elements of the show, calling it "outright" and "reprehensible". David Pollock of The Scotsman described the show in Glasgow as "a production focused upon a [person] with a particular brand of star quality which is rather being as much like her audience as possible." Reviewing the show in Stockholm, Natasha Azarmi of Aftonbladet gave a mixed review and called the show was "between mediocre and magic".

Commercial performance
According to Billboard Boxscore, the North American leg of the tour generated $20 million in ticket sales and played to 260,763 fans over 20 shows. The highest grossing show of the leg was at the Barclays Center in Brooklyn, playing for 15,249 and grossing $1.5 million. Washington D.C.'s Capital One Arena drew the largest crowd of the leg with a total of 16,141 tickets were sold.

The Tell Me You Love Me World Tour ranked at #71 on Pollstar'''s 2018 Year-End Top 100 North American Tours chart with a total gross of $17.8 million.

Set list 
This set list is from the concert on March 10, 2018, in Minneapolis, Minnesota. It is not intended to represent all tour dates.

 "You Don't Do It for Me Anymore"
 "Daddy Issues"
 "Cool for the Summer"
 "Sexy Dirty Love"
 "Heart Attack" (Shortened)
 "Give Your Heart a Break" (Shortened)
 "Confident"
 "Games"
 "Concentrate"
 "Cry Baby"
 "Lonely"
 "No Promises"
 "Échame la Culpa"
 "Warrior"
 "Father"
 "Smoke & Mirrors"
Encore
 "Sorry Not Sorry"
 "Tell Me You Love Me"

Notes
 During the shows in San Diego and Inglewood, Lovato performed "Yes".
 During the European leg, "Games" and "Smoke & Mirrors" were replaced with "Solo" and "Fall in Line", respectively.
 During the show in Manchester, Lovato performed "Skyscraper", in place of "Father", as tribute to the victims of the Manchester Arena Bombing.
 During the shows in London and Birmingham, Lovato performed "Sober" in place of "Father".

Tour dates

Cancelled shows

Personnel
Adapted from Projection Lights and Staging News.

Jesse Blevins – co-creative director, production designer
John Taylor – co-creative director
Andre Petrus – associate designer, programmer
John Dacosta – lighting director
Kevin Forster – lighting co
Glenn Power – lighting crew chief
Vreje Bakalian – lighting tech
James Brooks – lighting tech
William Rogers – lighting tech
Philip Schulte – lighting tech
Kevin Carswell – video director
Mike Drew – video co
Austen Stengle – video crew chief
David Bergfeld – video tech
Kyle Brinkman – video tech
Jose Cruz – video tech
Andrew DiCarlo – video tech
TAIT – staging
Brian Rhode – automation
Pyrotex Special Effects – FX, cryo
Amanda Pindus – FX
Andre Morales – tour manager
Chris Coffie – production manager
Matt McCormick – VER project manager
Joe Skarz – production assistant
Liz Dlutowski – production assistant
Geddy Lee Webb – stage manager
Nicole Didomenico – rigger
Bill Heinzlmeir – rigger
Bob Madison – carpenter
Matt Sperling – carpenter

References

Notes

Citations

Demi Lovato concert tours
2018 concert tours
Concert tours of North America
Concert tours of Europe